Giuseppe Marchetti (10 November 1934 – 30 August 2021) was an Italian literary critic and journalist.

References

1934 births
2021 deaths
Italian journalists
Place of birth missing
Place of death missing
Italian literary critics
University of Urbino alumni
Sapienza University of Rome alumni
People from the Province of Modena